Magic Is A Child is the seventh album from English progressive rock band Nektar. This album is one of only two studio albums released by Nektar without Roye Albrighton on guitar and lead vocals, instead featuring Dave Nelson; the other is The Other Side (2020).

Brooke Shields, 12 years old at the time, is the model on the cover.

The track "Train from Nowhere" features  Robert Fripp of King Crimson on lead guitar (under the pseudonym “Walt Nektroid".)

Reception

Allmusic gave the album a positive retrospective review, praising Nektar's switching to "shorter, punchier songs", "swelling" keyboards, "symphonic" guitars, and "breezy pop".

Track listing

Personnel
Dave Nelson - guitar, vocals
Alan "Taff" Freeman - synthesizer, keyboards, vocals
Derek "Mo" Moore - bass, vocals
Ron Howden - percussion, drums, vocals, Smurds

Additional personnel
Julien Barber, Kermit Moore, Michael Commins, Anthony Posk - string quartet
Larry Fast - synthesizer, programming, processing
Walt Nektroid - guitar on "Train from Nowhere"
Jeffrey Kawalek - production, engineering

References

External links
 Magic is a Child at Project Nektor Music

Nektar albums
1977 albums
Polydor Records albums